Carl Dennis Eyden (born 9 November 1980) is an English cricketer. Eyden is a right-handed batsman who bowls right-arm medium-fast. He was born at Burton upon Trent, Staffordshire.

Eyden represented the Derbyshire Cricket Board in 3 List A matches during 2001. These came against Wiltshire and Cambridgeshire in the 2001 Cheltenham & Gloucester Trophy and against Bedfordshire in the 1st round of the 2002 Cheltenham & Gloucester Trophy which was held in 2001. In his 3 List A matches, he took a single wicket at a bowling average of 60.00, with best figures of 1/60.

References

External links
Carl Eyden at Cricinfo
Carl Eyden at CricketArchive

1980 births
Living people
Sportspeople from Burton upon Trent
Sportspeople from Staffordshire
English cricketers
Derbyshire Cricket Board cricketers